Beverley Lenna Brewis (15 June 1930 – 22 March 2006) was a New Zealand high jumper who represented her country at the 1950 British Empire Games.

Early life and family
Born on 15 June 1930, Brewis was the daughter of Avril Hume Brewis (née Strachan) and Edward Cecil Brewis, a doctor, of the Hamilton suburb of Claudelands.

Athletics

Death
Brewis died in Hamilton on 22 March 2006, and her body was cremated at Hamilton Park Crematorium.

References 

1930 births
2006 deaths
Sportspeople from Hamilton, New Zealand
Commonwealth Games competitors for New Zealand
Athletes (track and field) at the 1950 British Empire Games
New Zealand female high jumpers